Kaukauna is a city in Outagamie and Calumet counties, Wisconsin, United States. The population was 15,462 at the 2010 census. It is a part of the Appleton, Wisconsin Metropolitan Statistical Area.

History
Kaukauna is a Native American word and in various languages means "portage", "long portage", "place where pickerel are caught", and "place of pike". This area was traditionally home to the Ho-Chunk and Menominee peoples. The first Europeans in the area were the French. The first Catholic missionary in the area, Fr. Claude Allouez, commented on the "apple trees and vine stalks in abundance" that he found the people of Kaukauna cultivating. Kaukauna became an outpost of trade in Green Bay and saw much intermarriage between French and Menominee people, leading to a Métis culture which produced local leaders such as Augustin Grignon.

In 1836, following years of negotiations about how to accommodate the Oneida, Stockbridge-Munsee, and Brothertown peoples who were removed from New York, the Menominee ceded over four million acres of land to the United States in the Treaty of the Cedars. Grignon of Kaukauna was one of the signatories of the treaty.

Prior to 1880, and shortly afterwards, Kaukauna was known as "The Lion on the Fox". This nickname was changed to "The Electric City" upon the completion of the hydroelectric plant. When the city was incorporated in 1885, it was separated from the adjacent rural parts of the town. The first recorded land deed in Wisconsin was assigned to Dominique Ducharme in 1793. He obtained  from the Menominee Indians for two barrels of rum and other gifts. These acres are the original site of the town of Kaukauna. The property was purchased by Charles A. Grignon (and recorded Dec. 18, 1828), who built a mansion on the river on Kaukauna's north side. The home, which bears Grignon's name, is operated as a museum by the Outagamie County Historical Society.

Geography
Kaukauna is located in southeastern Outagamie County, with a small portion extending south into Calumet County along State Highway 55 (Friendship Drive).

The city is divided into the North Side and South Side by the Fox River, which is spanned by four bridges.

Climate

Demographics

2010 census
As of the census of 2010, there were 15,462 people, 6,270 households, and 4,090 families living in the city. The racial makeup of the city was 94.5% White, 0.7% African American, 0.8% Native American, 1.3% Asian, 1.0% from other races, and 1.6% from two or more races. Hispanic or Latino of any race were 2.6% of the population.

There were 6,270 households, of which 33.9% had children under the age of 18 living with them, 50.2% were married couples living together, 10.3% had a female householder with no husband present, 4.8% had a male householder with no wife present, and 34.8% were non-families. 27.9% of all households were made up of individuals, and 10.6% had someone living alone who was 65 years of age or older. The average household size was 2.45 and the average family size was 3.01.

The median age in the city was 34.6 years. 25.8% of residents were under the age of 18; 8.3% were between the ages of 18 and 24; 29.5% were from 25 to 44; 24.2% were from 45 to 64; and 12.2% were 65 years of age or older. The gender makeup of the city was 49.5% male and 50.5% female.

2000 census
As of the census of 2000, there were 12,983 people, 4,971 households, and 3,365 families living in the city.  The population density was 2,092.5 people per square mile (808.5/km2).  There were 5,142 housing units at an average density of 320.2 persons/km2 (828.8 persons/sq mi).  The racial makeup of the city was 95.48% White, 0.27% African American, 0.75% Native American, 2.22% Asian, 0.07% Pacific Islander, 0.30% from other races, and 0.91% from two or more races.  0.79% of the population were Hispanic or Latino of any race.

There were 4,971 households, out of which 35.5% had children under the age of 18 living with them, 55.0% were married couples living together, 8.7% have a woman whose husband does not live with her, and 32.3% were non-families. 26.6% of all households were made up of individuals, and 12.3% had someone living alone who was 65 years of age or older.  The average household size was 2.57 and the average family size was 3.16.

In the city, the population was spread out, with 27.7% under the age of 18, 8.6% from 18 to 24, 30.5% from 25 to 44, 19.4% from 45 to 64, and 13.7% who were 65 years of age or older.  The median age was 35 years. For every 100 females, there were 97.0 males.  For every 100 females age 18 and over, there were 94.4 males.

The median income for a household in the city was $43,980, and the median income for a family was $50,187. Males had a median income of $38,880 versus $22,830 for females. The per capita income for the city was $18,748.  4.8% of the population and 2.6% of families were below the poverty line.  Out of the total people living in poverty, 4.6% are under the age of 18 and 10.4% are 65 or older.

Transportation
Kaukauna is located at the intersections of several major roads. Interstate 41, which forms the backbone of the Fox Cities' transit network, runs along the northern edge of the city and intersects Wisconsin Highway 55, Wisconsin Highway 96, and two county roads that serve as major thoroughfares in the city. US 10 is just to the south of Kaukauna, and Wisconsin Highway 441 is just to the west. Kaukauna is a member of Valley Transit, which provides bus service. Kaukauna is served by Appleton International Airport for airport service.

Economy
The city has diverse industrial and manufacturing businesses, including the Oscar Thilmany Paper Mill, constructed in 1883.  The name dropped off the mill when it was purchased by HammerMill in 1969, which was in turn bought by International Paper in 1986.

In 2005, New York-based equity firm Kohlberg & Company bought the mill, changed the name back to Thilmany, and created a company of the same name. It is now owned by KPS Capital Partners, and was renamed Expera Specialty Solutions in 2013. In 2018, it was sold to Ahlstrom-Munksjo. 
Kaukauna cheese, once made in the city, is now manufactured by the Bel/Kaukauna corporation in the neighboring village of Little Chute.

Education

Kaukauna is served by the Kaukauna Area School District, whose enrollment totals almost 4,000 students between kindergarten and 12th grade. There are four public elementary schools, one middle school, and Kaukauna High School. Two parochial schools for children through the eighth grade exist in Kaukauna St. Ignatius Catholic school and Trinity Lutheran School.

National Register of Historic Places
Locations in Kaukauna that are listed on the National Register of Historic Places:
 Capt. Matthew J. Meade House
 Charles A. Grignon House
 Charles W. Stribley House
 Fargo's Furniture Store
 Former United States Post Office
 Frank St. Andrews House
 Free Public Library of Kaukauna
 Holy Cross Church
 Julius J. Martens Company Building
 Kaukauna Locks Historic District
 Klein Dairy Farmhouse
 Kuehn Blacksmith Shop-Hardware Store
 Lindauer and Rupert Block
 Merritt Black House
 Nicolet Public School
 Norman Brokaw House
 St. Mary's Catholic Church

Notable people

 Thomas Armstrong, Wisconsin State Representative
 Steve Badger, professional poker player
 Annastasia Batikis, baseball player
 Mark Belling, conservative talk-show host
 Thomas Cane, Chief Judge of the Wisconsin Court of Appeals
 Eugene DeBruin, American pilot, MIA in the Vietnam War
 William J. Gantter, Wisconsin State Representative
 Carl Giordana, athlete and activist
 Augustin Grignon, fur trader and businessman
 Norbert Hayes, NFL player
 Ric Killian, North Carolina politician
 Jordan McCabe, Athlete & Internet Personality
 Lee Meyerhofer, Wisconsin State Representative
 Gordon Myse, Judge of the Wisconsin Court of Appeals
 Arnold C. Otto, Wisconsin State Representative
 Peter Philipps, Wisconsin State Representative
 Gary J. Schmidt, Wisconsin State Representative
 Red Smith, NFL and MLB player
 William N. Vander Loop, Wisconsin State Representative
 David Viaene, NFL player

References

External links
 City of Kaukauna

 

Cities in Wisconsin
Cities in Outagamie County, Wisconsin
Populated places established in 1793
1793 establishments in the Northwest Territory
Cities in Calumet County, Wisconsin
Appleton–Fox Cities metropolitan area